KHI may refer to:

 Khi, a Coptic letter
 Jinnah International Airport (IATA: KHI) at Karachi, Pakistan
 Kansas Health Institute founded by Kansas Health Foundation
 Karachi City
 Karnatak Health Institute, India, co-founded by N. S. Hardikar
 Kawasaki Heavy Industries, a Japanese multinational corporation
 Kelvin-Helmholtz instability, a type of fluid instability
 Kevin Harvick Incorporated, a NASCAR team
 Kinetic Hydrate Inhibitor
 Kunsthistorisches Institut in Florenz, Florence, Italy
 Kyiv Art Institute, Ukraine

See also
 WKHI, former name of radio station WWFG, Ocean City, Maryland